Omar Mahmud al-Muntasir (died 1999) is a Libyan Politician. He servered as minister of Justice between October 1962 to January 1964 (in Muhammad Osman Said and Mohieddin Fikini cabinets), interrupted only by his short service (probably the shortest in Libya's history) as foreign minister (6–19 March 1963).

He is the son of Libyan prime minister Mahmud al-Muntasir.

Notes

Foreign ministers of Libya
Justice ministers of Libya
1999 deaths
Year of birth missing